Eclectic  may refer to:

Music
 Eclectic (Eric Johnson and Mike Stern album), 2014
 Eclectic (Big Country album), 1996
 Eclectic Method, name of an audio-visual remix act
 Eclecticism in music, the conscious use of styles alien to the composer's own nature
 Eclectic Guitar, a compilation recording by American guitarist Chet Atkins
 Morning Becomes Eclectic, a radio program in Santa Monica, California
 Sounds Eclectic, a radio program
 Eclectic Discs, a record label renamed to Esoteric Recordings
 Eclectic Reel, a collection of music by Italian composer Stefano Lentini

Organizations
 Eclectic Society (Christian), an English missionary and anti-slavery society
 Eclectic Society (fraternity), an American fraternity, Phi Nu Theta

Other
 Eclectic, Alabama, a village
 Eclecticism, a philosophical movement
 Eclecticism in architecture, a nineteenth and twentieth-century architectural style
 Eclecticism in art, mixed styles
 Eclectic approach, an approach to education
 Eclectic paradigm, an economic theory, published by John H. Dunning in 1980
 Eclectic medicine, a 19th century combination of herbalism, physical therapies, and other substances
 Eclectic paganism, paganism mixed with other religious paths or philosophies
 Eclectic psychotherapy, in which the clinician uses more than one approach
 Eclectic shorthand, or cross shorthand, a system of shorthand

See also
 Hybrid martial arts